Johnny Dexter was a fictional footballer who appeared in three different comic strips in the British boys' comic Roy of the Rovers during the 1970s, 80s and 90s.  He was a defender, playing centre-back for Danefield United and England and usually left-back for Melchester Rovers. He was amongst the most popular characters in the comic, being the only one other than Roy himself ever to appear on the cover of one of the comic's annuals, and is still fondly remembered by fans of the "golden age" of British sports-themed comics.

The Hard Man
Dexter made his debut in the very first issue of the weekly Roy of the Rovers comic, dated 25 September 1976, starring in the strip The Hard Man. Johnny was the titular character, so named because of his rugged style of play and fiery temper, which often got him into trouble with referees. He initially played for Danefield United, but was transferred to Spanish team Real Granpala, where he first encountered Hungarian manager Viktor Boskovic, who followed him back to Danefield when he returned there.

The strip was written by Barrie Tomlinson and usually drawn by Doug Maxted.  The tone of the strip was generally light-hearted, with large doses of humour provided by the camp antics of the fat, bald-headed Boskovic, who was fond of kissing his players when they performed well, and often fainted during moments of high drama.  Johnny also regularly found himself involved in off-pitch slapstick, including one memorable storyline in which he travelled to Italy to discuss signing for a top Serie A team. After rebuffing the team's owner, he ended up in prison and then was forced to try and flee the country dressed in drag.

The Hard Man ran for nine years, but came to an end (as part of a larger overhaul of the comic) when a rising star named Bobby Williams took Dexter's first team place during a pre-season tour of the continent. When Johnny returned for pre-season training he put in a transfer request, which Viktor accepted. Somewhat bizarrely considering his status as a former England international, the only club to make a bid for Johnny was the worst club in the Football League, Burnside Athletic, who had finished bottom of the Fourth Division in three of the previous four seasons. Johnny was granted a free transfer and appeared in the "Hard Man" strip for the last time on 10 August 1985.

Dexter's Dozen
Upon moving to Burnside, Dexter began appearing in a new story entitled Dexter's Dozen.  Barrie Tomlinson remained the writer, but Mike White took over as the artist, using a much more realistic style than the comedic art which had been seen in The Hard Man.  This was in keeping with the initial tone of the new story, which eschewed comedy in favour of a serious depiction of the struggles of the lowly club.  Soon, however, the tone shifted somewhat, as Boskovic was re-introduced, taking over as Burnside's manager and once again displaying his trademark antics, including making the team wear clown costumes during the half-time interval of a match where they were performing especially poorly, and making them train atop a huge piece of apparatus resembling an assault course, going so far as to push players off the top into a vat full of water if they under-performed.  The strip ran for only one season, during which Dexter was able to lead his new club to promotion, with the final episode appearing in the comic dated 16 August 1986.

Melchester Rovers
During the summer of 1986, the Melchester Rovers team depicted in the main Roy of the Rovers strip had been decimated by a terrorist atrocity which had killed several players, and Dexter joined the club as one of manager Roy Race's new signings as he re-built the team (making him one of a number of players who migrated from their own strip to the main RotR strip during the comic's lifetime). Dexter was signed on a free transfer, playing a key role in the new-look Rovers team for a number of seasons (before switching to left-back and the number 3 shirt during the 1990-91 season). He continued to play for Rovers until the demise of the weekly comic in 1993 and then went on to appear for them during the subsequent short-lived Roy of the Rovers Monthly, his temper causing rifts with both Blackie Gray and Mervyn Wallace during their spells as Rovers manager. He also memorably had an on-pitch fight with his own teammate, Roy's son Rocky. While with the Rovers he helped them win the Littlewoods Cup in 1987, the Football League Championship in 1988 and 1992, and the FA Cup in 1990.

Career

International career
Johnny Dexter, one of the hardest tackling-midfielders ever appeared on English fields represented his nation on several occasions collecting 8 caps, including the legendary game against Johan Seegrun's Netherlands in February 1978. Unfortunately he never made it to a World Cup, but it is worth to be mentioned that he had been selected  in Roy Race's dream squad for the 1982 Argentina tournament.

Managerial career
When the Roy of the Rovers strip was revived in the BBC's Match of the Day magazine in 1997, Dexter was depicted as the manager of FA Premier League side Castlemere, whom he led to the FA Cup Final in 1999 where they lost out to Melchester Rovers.

2018 reboot
In the 2018 Roy of the Rovers reboot Dexter was depicted as a Melchester Rovers legend who became Melchester's coach after he retired. Johnny is seen as the biggest Melchester supporter around apart from Roy's father, he is also Melchester's manager Kevin Mouse's right hand man, after an altercation with Melchester's unscrupulous owner he was fired, with Roy's recommendation he accepts a job as manager of Melchester's women's club Sowerby. At Sowerby Johnny coaches Roy's fiery younger sister Roxanne known as "Rocky" and Sowerby's captain Ffion Guthrie sister of Melchester's captain Vic Guthrie. After Melchester's owner & an agent called Alan Talbot were arrested for fraud & arson charges, Kevin Mouse reinstates Johnny back to his position as Melchester's coach.

References

Sources
The official Roy of the Rovers website

Dexter, Johnny
British comics